Knickerbocker Hotel may refer to:

 Hollywood Knickerbocker Hotel, Los Angeles, California
 Knickerbocker Hotel (Milwaukee, Wisconsin)
 The Knickerbocker Hotel, New York City